Chris Orr (born June 17, 1997) is an American football linebacker for the New Jersey Generals of the United States Football League (USFL). He played for the Wisconsin Badgers in college and for the Carolina Panthers of the National Football League.

Early years
During his career at DeSoto High School, Orr had 374 total tackles, 13 forced fumbles, four fumble recoveries and three defensive TDs.

College career
During his first season with Wisconsin, Orr played in 10 games and made 6 starts. In those games, he registered 46 total tackles, 2 tackles for loss, and had 0.5 sacks. During his second season with Wisconsin, Orr appeared in 1 game and made one start, but he suffered a season-ending torn ACL on his first defensive snap of the season. During his third season with Wisconsin, Orr played in 12 games and made 8 starts. In those games, he made 36 total tackles, 3 tackles for loss, had 2 sacks, and had 1 interception. During his junior season at Wisconsin, Orr played in all 13 games and made 1 start. In those games, he had 27 tackles, 1 tackle for loss, 2 fumble recoveries and 1 interception. He also won the team's Special Teams Player of the Year award during this season.

During his senior season at Wisconsin, Orr played in and started all 14 games. In those games, as a team captain, he had 78 tackles, 14 tackles for loss, and 11.5 sacks. He also had 8 quarterback hurries, broke up 5 passes and forced 2 fumbles. His 11.5 sacks during this season were the most in a season by an inside/middle linebacker in school history, and he helped lead his team to a single-season school record 51 sacks as a team.

Professional career

Carolina Panthers
Orr went undrafted in the 2020 NFL Draft. On April 30, 2020, Orr was signed by the Carolina Panthers as an undrafted free agent. He was waived on September 5, 2020, and signed to the practice squad the next day. He was elevated to the active roster on October 3 and November 14 for the team's weeks 4 and 10 games against the Arizona Cardinals and Tampa Bay Buccaneers, and reverted to the practice squad after each game. He was signed to the active roster on November 21, 2020. Orr was waived on December 12, 2020, and re-signed to the practice squad three days later. He signed a reserve/future contract with the Panthers on January 4, 2021. He was waived on May 24, 2021.

New Jersey Generals
Orr was drafted by the New Jersey Generals in the 21st round of the 2022 USFL Draft. He was transferred to the team's inactive roster on May 20, 2022, with a knee injury.

Coaching career
Before Orr was drafted by the New Jersey Generals, he was the Wisconsin Director of Player Development.

Personal life
Orr's father is two-time Super Bowl champion and former Washington Redskins tight end Terry Orr. His two brothers, Zach and Nick, also played professional football. Zach is currently the inside linebackers coach for the Baltimore Ravens and Nick is currently a free agent.

References

1997 births
Living people
People from DeSoto, Texas
Players of American football from Texas
Sportspeople from the Dallas–Fort Worth metroplex
American football linebackers
Wisconsin Badgers football players
Carolina Panthers players
New Jersey Generals (2022) players